The Kulinić was a medieval Bosnian ruling family from the second half of the 12th century to the first half of the 13th century.  Its founder, Kulin, was made Bosnia's Ban by the Eastern Roman Emperor Manuel I Comnenus in 1180, but he was present in Bosnian political and social life since its takeover by the Byzantines from the Hungarians in 1163. He was one of the greatest early Bosnian rulers and gradually made Bosnia an ordered and de facto independent state.  His son, Stjepan, succeeded him as Ban and totally reversed his father's pro-Bosnian politics into a pro-Roman Catholic ecclesiastical order.  This brought downfall upon the dynasty of Kulinić – as the Bosnian Bogumils dethroned him and forced him to retreat to his son in Usora – where he died in 1236. Stjepan's son – Sibislav Prince of Usora – attempted to restore his House's glory by fighting Bosnia's Grand Ban Matej Ninoslav at the end of his reign.

Rulers
 Ban Kulin of Bosnia (reigned 1180–1204)
 Ban  Stjepan Kulinić (died in 1236)(ruled 1204–1232)
 Prince Sibislav of Usora

See also
 List of rulers of Bosnia
 History of Bosnia and Herzegovina

 
 
Bosnian royal families